Ronald Joseph Forbes (born 5 April 1985) is a track athlete from the Cayman Islands.

Forbes is an All American 110 meter hurdler and 60 meter hurdler who competed collegiality for Florida International University from 2005-2008 . Forbes went on to pursue a  professional track and field career competing in the 2008, 2012, and 2016 Summer Olympics. Forbes has competed in the 2011 and 2015 Athletics World Championships. Indoors, Forbes has qualified and competed 2010 and 2012 World Indoor Athletics Championships. Forbes has competed in the 2006, 2010, 2014, and 2018 Commonwealth Games.  During the opening ceremonies for the 2008 and 2016 Summer Olympics he was the flag-bearer for the Cayman Islands.

He took up athletics when he was 14 as a discus thrower and shot putter, because he hoped it would give him the opportunity for travel and a scholarship. He eventually earned a scholarship in 2004 to Bacone College in Muskogee Oklahoma where he became the Red River Athletic Conference champion in the 400 meter hurdles and after a year, transferred to Florida International University. During his time at Florida International University, he was a two time All American, finishing 3rd in the 2008 NCAA Indoor Championships and 8th in the 2008 NCAA Outdoor Championships. He is currently the Cayman Islands National Record Holder and the Florida International University Record Holder in the 55, 60 and 110 meter hurdles. In 2017 he was awarded the honor of having the Football Stadium in his home district of North side renamed to The Ronald J Forbes Playing Field; in the same year he has been recognized as a National Sports hero in the Cayman Islands.

Personal bests

Outdoor
200 m: 21.65 s (wind: +0.3 m/s) –  Coral Gables, Florida, 12 April 2008
110 m hurdles: 13.36 s (wind: +0.4 m/s) –  Clermont, FL, 30 April 2016
400 m hurdles: 52.79 s –  New Orleans, Louisiana, 15 May 2005

Indoor
60 m hurdles: 7.58 s –  Fayetteville, Arkansas, 14 March 2008
200 m: 22.33 s –  Gainesville, Florida, 26 January 2008

Achievements
Forbes is the Cayman Islands and Florida International University 110 metres hurdles (outdoor), 60 metres hurdles (indoor) and 55 metres hurdles (indoor) record holder.

References

 Ronald Forbes' profile at Florida International University Athletics

External links

Sports reference biography

1985 births
Living people
Caymanian male hurdlers
Olympic athletes of the Cayman Islands
Athletes (track and field) at the 2008 Summer Olympics
Athletes (track and field) at the 2012 Summer Olympics
Athletes (track and field) at the 2016 Summer Olympics
Athletes (track and field) at the 2006 Commonwealth Games
Athletes (track and field) at the 2010 Commonwealth Games
Athletes (track and field) at the 2014 Commonwealth Games
Athletes (track and field) at the 2018 Commonwealth Games
Commonwealth Games competitors for the Cayman Islands
Athletes (track and field) at the 2015 Pan American Games
Pan American Games competitors for the Cayman Islands
Florida International University alumni
World Athletics Championships athletes for the Cayman Islands